Gavin Hamilton (1723, Lanarkshire – 4 January 1798, Rome) was a Scottish neoclassical history painter,
who is more widely remembered for his searches for antiquities in the neighbourhood of Rome. These roles in combination made him an arbiter of neoclassical taste.

Biography
Born in Lanarkshire, Scotland, in 1723, by 1744 he was in Italy, and probably studied in Rome in the studio of Agostino Masucci. From 1748 to 1750 he shared an apartment with James Stuart, Matthew Brettingham and Nicholas Revett, and with them visited Naples and Venice. On returning to Britain, he spent several years portrait-painting in London (1751–1756). At the end of that period, he returned to Rome. He lived there for the next four decades, until his death in 1798.

Aside from a few portraits of friends, the Hamilton family, and British people on the Grand Tour, most of his paintings, many of which are very large, were of classical Greek and Roman subjects.  His most famous is a cycle of six paintings from Homer's Iliad, intended to have a pictorial impact equivalent to the epic grandeur of Homer as identified by Thomas Blackwell in his An Enquiry into the Life and Writings of Homer (1735), and also influenced by George Turnbull's Treatise on Ancient Painting (1740). As engraved by Domenico Cunego and reproduced, these were widely disseminated widely and were enormously influential. Also influential was Hamilton's Death of Lucretia (1760s), also known as the Oath of Brutus. This inspired a series of "oath paintings" by European painters, which included Jacques-Louis David's noted Oath of the Horatii (1784).  Like most later paintings of the scene, it placed it over Lucretia's dead body. In Livy it is made later, after the overthrow of the Roman monarchy.

As a painter of classical subjects, Hamilton was highly regarded by Johann Joachim Winckelmann, writer Goethe, young sculptor Antonio Canova and others in Rome, but was less appreciated in Britain. He did receive a commission to paint the altar piece of Sant'Andrea degli Scozzesi, the Scottish national church in Rome, for which he portrayed the Martyrdom of St Andrew.

As an art dealer and archaeologist, Hamilton undertook excavations at Hadrian's Villa in Tivoli in 1769–1771, at first to acquire marble for his sculptor to restore sculptures. His excavators reopened the outlet of a low-lying swampy area and "after some weeks' work underground by lamp-light and up to the knees in muddy water" retrieved sculptures from the muck, where they had been thrown centuries before with timber when Christians levelled the sacred grove.(Smith 1901:308). From 1771 Hamilton excavated other sites in the environs of Rome: Cardinal Flavio Chigi's Tor Colombaro, 1771–72, Albano, 1772, Monte Cagnolo 1772–73, Ostia 1774–75, the Villa Fonseca on the Caelian Hill in Rome, Roma Vecchia (the Villa dei Quintili), ca 1775 Castel di Guido and Gabii.

In an age when restorations to Roman sculptures were broadly conceived and the refinishing of whole surfaces was still common practice, Hamilton maintained a reputation as an honest man who did not tamper unduly with the sculptures that passed through his hands. Hamilton sold many of the works of art he recovered to his British clients, most notably to Charles Townley, to whom the painter wrote: "the most valuable acquisition a man of refined taste can make, is a piece of fine Greek Sculpture"; and to William Petty, 2nd Earl of Shelburne at Shelburne, later Lansdowne House, London. In 1771 Hamilton discovered the Warwick Vase at Hadrian's Villa. He sold it to Sir William Hamilton, a connoisseur and the British envoy at Naples.

Gavin Hamilton worked closely with Giovanni Battista Piranesi. He was an early advisor of Antonio Canova, a young sculptor whom he met at a dinner party in December 1779 on Canova's first visit to Rome. The painter advised the younger man to put aside his early, Rococo manner and concentrate on conflating the study of nature with the best of antiquities and a narrow range of classic modern sculptors.

In 1785 Hamilton bought Leonardo da Vinci's Virgin of the Rocks and sent it to London for sale. His purchase was the version now held by the National Gallery, London.

Such hunting and sale of antiquities was considered a marginally shady undertaking. Hamilton was successful in making generous offerings to the Vatican's Museo Pio-Clementino, as the Pope claimed one-third of all excavated works and had the right to forbid export of outstanding treasures. In addition, Hamilton paid landowners for excavating rights, so kept his peace with them.

He died in Rome on 4 January 1798.

Further reading
 B. Cassidy, ed., The Life & Letters of Gavin Hamilton (1723–1798): Artist & Art Dealer in Eighteenth-Century Rome (2 vols., 2012)
 Ilaria Bignamini, 'British Conquerors of the Marbles, 1 Gavin Hamilton as Archaeologist', in Ilaria Bignamini and Clare Hornsby, Digging And Dealing in Eighteenth-Century Rome (2010. Yale U.P.), p. 194–207
 M. Cima, 'Gavin Hamilton a Gabii ...', in Villa Borghese: storia e gestione, ed. A. Campitelli (2005)
 B. Cassidy, 'Gavin Hamilton, Thomas Pitt and statues for Stowe', in Burlington Magazine; 146 (2004 December), p. 806–814
 A Dictionary of British and Irish Travellers to Italy, 1701–1800, Compiled from the Brinsley Ford Archive by John Ingamells (1997), p. 447
 David Irwin, 'Gavin Hamilton Archaeologist, Painter and Dealer', in The Art Bulletin; 44:2 (1962 June), p. 87–102
 Duncan Macmillan, Scottish Painting: Ramsay to Raeburn, in Parker, Geoffrey (ed.), Cencrastus No. 17, Summer 1984, pp. 25 - 29, 
 A. H. Smith, 'Gavin Hamilton's Letters to Charles Townley', in The Journal of Hellenic Studies; 21 (1901), p. 306–321

See also
 William Hamilton (diplomat)
 Charles Townley

Notes

External links

 Works in the National Galleries of Scotland
 A biography of Gavin Hamilton
 4 works from the ArtFund
 2 works from Tate Britain

18th-century British painters
Neoclassical painters
Scottish archaeologists
1723 births
1798 deaths
British art dealers
18th-century Scottish painters
Scottish male painters